Mark Vaiao (formerly Mark Leafa) (born 4 December 1980) is a former Samoa international rugby league footballer who played as a  or  in the 1990s and 2000s. 

He played at club level for the Otahuhu Leopards (junior), Canterbury Bulldogs, Sydney Roosters, Easts Tigers, South Sydney Rabbitohs, Leigh Centurions, Wynnum Manly in the Queensland Cup, Whitehaven, Castleford Tigers (Heritage № 868) and the Norths Devils in the Queensland Cup.

Playing career

International career
Vaiao played for Samoa at the 2000 World Cup, he was named in the Samoa training squad for the 2008 World Cup but did not make the final side.

References

External links

1980 births
Living people
Castleford Tigers players
Eastern Suburbs Tigers players
Expatriate rugby league players in Australia
Expatriate rugby league players in England
Leigh Leopards players
New Zealand expatriate rugby league players
New Zealand expatriate sportspeople in Australia
New Zealand expatriate sportspeople in England
New Zealand sportspeople of Samoan descent
New Zealand rugby league players
Norths Devils players
Otahuhu Leopards players
Rugby league locks
Rugby league props
Rugby league second-rows
Samoa national rugby league team players
South Sydney Rabbitohs players
Sydney Roosters players
Whitehaven R.L.F.C. players
Wynnum Manly Seagulls players